Nucleolaria nucleus, the wrinkled cowry, is a species of sea snail, a cowry, a marine gastropod mollusk in the family Cypraeidae, the cowries.

There is one subspecies: Staphylaea nucleus madagascariensis (Gmelin, 1791) (synonym : Cypraea madagascariensis Gmelin, 1791) (common name: the wrinkled cowrie). This subspecies is distributed in the Indian Ocean along Kenya, Madagascar and Tanzania.

Description
This shell is oval, the dorsum surface is light orange-brown with a thin longitudinal line in the middle, many small round protuberances and two orange areas at the extremities. The base is light orange and the small teeth are extended to both sides of the entire base. In the living cowries the mantle is brownish, with well-developed papillae.

Distribution
This species is distributed in the Red Sea and in the Indian Ocean along Aldabra, Chagos, Kenya, Madagascar, the Mascarene Basin, Mauritius, Réunion, the Seychelles, Somalia and Tanzania, as well in Western Central Pacific Ocean (Philippines, Indonesia, Australia, Guam and Hawaii).

References

 Verdcourt, B. 1954 - The cowries of the East African Coast Kenya, Tanganyika, Zanzibar and Pemba - Journal of the East Africa Natural History Society 224 96: 129-144, 17 pls.
 Felix Lorenz and Alex Hubert : A Guide to Worldwide Cowries, second revised edition - Conch Books, 2002

External links
 Biolib
 WoRMS

Cypraeidae
Gastropods described in 1758
Taxa named by Carl Linnaeus